German submarine U-458 was a Type VIIC U-boat built for Nazi Germany's Kriegsmarine for service during World War II.
She was laid down on 16 October 1940 by Deutsche Werke AG, Kiel as yard number 289, launched on 4 October 1941 and commissioned on 12 December 1941 under Oberleutnant zur See Kurt Diggins.

Design
German Type VIIC submarines were preceded by the shorter Type VIIB submarines. U-458 had a displacement of  when at the surface and  while submerged. She had two shafts and two  propellers.

U-458 was fitted with five  torpedo tubes (four fitted at the bow and one at the stern), fourteen torpedoes, one  SK C/35 naval gun, 220 rounds, and a  C/30 anti-aircraft gun. The boat had a complement of between forty-four and sixty.

Service history
The boat's career began with training at 8th U-boat Flotilla on 12 December 1941, followed by active service on 1 July 1942 as part of the 3rd Flotilla where she stayed for only four months, before transferring to Mediterranean operations with 29th Flotilla on 1 November 1942.

Wolfpacks
U-458 took part in one wolfpack, namely:
 Tümmler (1 – 11 October 1942)

Fate
There were 8 dead and 39 survivors.

Summary of raiding history

See also
 Mediterranean U-boat Campaign (World War II)

References

Bibliography

External links

German Type VIIC submarines
1941 ships
U-boats commissioned in 1941
U-boats sunk in 1943
U-boats sunk by depth charges
U-boats sunk by British warships
U-boats sunk by Greek warships
World War II shipwrecks in the Mediterranean Sea
World War II submarines of Germany
Ships built in Kiel
Maritime incidents in August 1942